Conrad Bursian (14 November 1830 – 21 September 1883) was a German philologist and archaeologist.

Biography 
He was born at Mutzschen in Saxony. When his parents moved to Leipzig, he received his early education at Thomasschule zu Leipzig. From 1847 to 1851 he was a student at the University of Leipzig, where his instructors included Moritz Haupt (1808–1874) and Otto Jahn (1813–1869). He then spent six months in Berlin, where he attended lectures given by Philipp August Böckh (1785–1867). In 1852 he completed his university studies at Leipzig, spending the next three years traveling in Belgium, France, Italy and Greece.

In 1856 he obtained his habilitation, and two years later was an associate professor in Leipzig. In 1861 he was appointed professor of philology and archaeology at Tübingen; in 1864 he was a professor of classical antiquities at Zürich. From 1869 at Jena, he was a professor and director of the archaeological museum, and in 1874 he relocated to Munich, where he served as a professor  until his death.

Principal works
His favorite classical authors were Aristophanes, Demosthenes, Theocritus and the Greek tragedians; among the Romans, he favoured Lucretius, Juvenal and the Elegiacs.

His most important works are:
Geographie von Griechenland (1862–1872) – Geography of Greece.
Beiträge zur Geschichte der klassischen Studien im Mittelalter (1873) – Contributions to the history of classical studies in the Middle Ages. 
Geschichte der klassischen Philologie in Deutschland (1883) – History of classical philology in Germany.
edition of Julius Firmicus Maternus' "De Errore Profanarum Religionum" (1856)
edition of Seneca the Elder's "Suasoriae" (1857).

See also
 Lustrum (journal), the successor to Bursians Jahresbericht

Notes

References

Further reading

External links
 

1830 births
1883 deaths
Archaeologists from Saxony
German classical scholars
German philologists
People from the Kingdom of Saxony
Humboldt University of Berlin alumni
Leipzig University alumni
Academic staff of Leipzig University
Academic staff of the University of Tübingen
Academic staff of the University of Zurich
Academic staff of the University of Jena
Academic staff of the Ludwig Maximilian University of Munich